The ISC World Data System (ISC-WDS) was created by the International Science Council's (ISC) General Assembly in October 2008.

 ISC-WDS goals are to preserve quality assured scientific data and information, to facilitate open access, and promote the adoption of standards.

History
The ISC World Data System superseded the World Data Centres (WDCs) and Federation of Astronomical and Geophysical data analysis Services (FAGS) created by ICSU to manage data generated by the International Geophysical Year (1957–1958).

Governance
The ISC World Data System is governed by a Scientific Committee(SC) made up of data scientists and experts. 
It is supported by the International Science Council as well as an International Programme Office (IPO), which is hosted and funded by the Japanese National Institute of Information and Communications Technology As of 2021, the International Program Office is hosted by the Oak Ridge Institute at the University of Tennessee (ORI at UT).

In 2018 WDS announced the creation of the International Technology Office (ITO) hosted by a Canadian consortium consisting of: Ocean Networks Canada at the University of Victoria, The Canadian Astronomy Data Centre and the Canadian Cryospheric Information Network/Polar Data Catalogue at the University of Waterloo.

A notable former member of the ICSU World Data System Scientific Committee is Professor Jane Hunter, who is the director of the E-Research lab in Queensland University.

Data Sharing Principles
The ISC World Data System member organizations adopt its Data Sharing Principles.
Data, metadata, products, and information should be fully and openly shared, subject to national or international jurisdictional laws and policies, including respecting appropriate extant restrictions, and in accordance with international standards of ethical research conduct. 
Data, metadata, products, and information produced for research, education, and public domain use will be made available with minimum time delay and free of charge, or for no more than the cost of dissemination, which may be waived for lower-income user communities to support equity in access. 
All who produce, share, and use data and metadata are stewards of those data, and have responsibility for ensuring that the authenticity, quality, and integrity of the data are preserved, and respect for the data source is maintained by ensuring privacy where appropriate, and encouraging appropriate citation of the dataset and original work and acknowledgement of the data repository. 
Data should be labelled 'sensitive' or 'restricted' only with appropriate justification and following clearly defined protocols, and should in any event be made available for use on the least restrictive basis possible

Members
Member organizations of the ISC World Data System join voluntarily in one of the four membership categories: Regular, Network, Partner, and Associate Members. Members contribute their data holdings, data services or products. The updated list of Members is available on the ISC World Data System website : ISC-WDS Membership

References

External links
www.icsu-wds.org  official website

International organizations based in Japan
International scientific organizations